Pure Prairie League is an American country rock band whose origins go back to 1965 and Waverly, Ohio, with singer and guitarist Craig Fuller, drummer Tom McGrail, guitarist and drummer Jim Caughlan and steel guitarist John David Call. Fuller started the band in 1970 and McGrail named it after a fictional 19th century temperance union featured in the 1939 Errol Flynn cowboy film Dodge City. In 1975 the band scored its biggest hit with the single "Amie", a track that originally appeared on their 1972 album Bustin' Out. Pure Prairie League scored five consecutive Top 40 LPs in the 1970s and added a sixth in the 1980s. They disbanded in 1988 but regrouped in 1998 and continue to perform . The line-up has been fluid over the years, with no one member having served over the band's entire history. The band's most recent line-up consists of Call, drummer Scott Thompson, keyboardist Randy Harper, guitarist Jeff Zona and bassist Jared Camic. Among the other notable past musicians to have played with Pure Prairie League include guitarists Vince Gill, Gary Burr and Curtis Wright.

History
Although the band has its roots in Waverly, it was actually formed in Columbus, Ohio and had its first success in Cincinnati. Craig Fuller, Tom McGrail, Jim Caughlan and John David Call had played together in various bands since high school, notably the Vikings, the Omars, the Sacred Turnips and the Swiss Navy.

In 1970 the first Pure Prairie League line-up was Fuller, McGrail, singer/songwriter/guitarist George Ed Powell (a popular Cincinnati folk singer), Phill Stokes (bassist in Columbus bands Sanhedrin Move and J.D. Blackfoot) and Robin Suskind (a popular guitar teacher in the University of Cincinnati neighborhood) on guitar and mandola, with John David Call joining the band later that year. Call's steel guitar added country credibility to the band's playlist and sparked guitar duels with Fuller that created the signature sound of the band. They rose to popularity as the house band at New Dilly's Pub in the Mt. Adams section of Cincinnati.

In mid-1971, McGrail and Stokes left the band to rehearse with  but were unable to put a viable band together. Jim Caughlan, who had played guitar and drums with Fuller, Call and McGrail in earlier bands, took over on drums and Jim Lanham from California, formerly of Country Funk, replaced Stokes on bass.

Early on, the Pure Prairie League was looking for national artist representation and they made contact with a well-known Cleveland based rock and roll promoter, Roger Abramson. At the behest of the group's roadie (who had also worked for the James Gang) Jim "Westy" Westermeyer, Abramson saw the band at New Dilly's Pub and later signed them to a management contract. Abramson was able to land a contract with RCA Records. He then placed Pure Prairie League as an opening act with many of the concerts he produced at that time.

Their eponymous first album used a Norman Rockwell Saturday Evening Post cover, showing a trail-worn cowboy, named Luke, who would appear on the cover of every Pure Prairie League recording thereafter. After releasing their debut album (recorded in New York City) in March 1972 and embarking on a nationwide tour, Call, Caughlan and Lanham all left the band.

At that point, Pure Prairie League owed RCA another album and Craig Fuller agreed to record the second record in RCA's Toronto studio with the help of George Ed Powell and Bob Ringe (who had also produced the first album). Al Brisco played pedal steel guitar on the session. Bustin' Out (begun in the summer of 1972) was produced by Ringe and featured the songs of Fuller and Powell. Billy Hinds from Cincinnati (drums, percussion) joined the band and Hinds's friend, Michael Connor, played piano on most of the sessions and would become a regular in the Pure Prairie League line-up for years to come. Mick Ronson added string arrangements to several tracks, most notably "Boulder Skies" and "Call Me Tell Me". Michael Reilly, who would become the longtime bass player and front man for the band, joined in early September 1972, soon after the record was completed. Bustin' Out was released in October 1972.

Shortly afterward, the group returned to Ohio and Fuller had to face trial for charges of draft evasion in Kentucky. Before conscientious objector (C.O.) status could be arranged, he was sentenced to six months in jail and forced to leave Pure Prairie League in February 1973. At this point, RCA dropped the band and their future looked bleak.

By August 1973, the band members were in Cincinnati and managed to persuade Call to return. Fuller, though out of prison by now, was working the late shift in a community hospital to satisfy his C.O. requirements and was not inclined to rejoin at that time. (He was eventually given a full pardon by President Gerald Ford.) Reilly took over as the band's leader and front man and brought in his friend Larry Goshorn (vocals, guitars) to replace Fuller in November 1973. Goshorn had played in a popular Ohio band called the Sacred Mushroom.

Pure Prairie League hit the road and began playing gigs constantly, mostly in the Northeast, Midwest and Southeast. As a result of their heavy schedule, particularly at colleges, their songs became well known; "Amie" (Craig Fuller's ode to an on-again/off-again relationship), from the second album, became a particular favorite.

Success
As "Amie" grew in popularity, radio stations began receiving requests for it. As a result, RCA re-released Bustin' Out and issued "Amie" as a single. It peaked at No. 27 on April 26, 1975, just as a minor bluegrass revival was underway on mid-western college campuses.

RCA re-signed Pure Prairie League and their third album, Two Lane Highway, was released in June 1975. It featured guest appearances by Chet Atkins, fiddler Johnny Gimble, Don Felder from The Eagles and Emmylou Harris, who dueted with the band on the song "Just Can't Believe It", which received much airplay on country stations. Highway was the band's highest 'charter' at No. 24 and Bustin' Out reached gold status. This began a string of five consecutive Top 40 album releases as If the Shoe Fits (January 1976), Dance (November 1976) and Live, Takin' the Stage (September 1977) all made the Top 40.

In 1977 Call left because of increasing back troubles. Larry Goshorn's brother, Tim, joined in time to record Just Fly (March 1978). But in 1978 there was a mass exodus as the Goshorns left to form their own group, The Goshorn Brothers, and Powell, the last remaining original member, retired from the road to run his pig farm in Ohio. However the group soldiered on as Reilly quickly brought in temporary members, California country rocker Chris Peterson (vocals, guitar) and the group's soundman, Jeff Redefer (guitar), to play a few shows until new, permanent players could be located.

In September 1978 auditions led to the hiring of Vince Gill (vocals, guitars, mandolin, banjo, fiddle). Further auditions brought in Steven Patrick Bolin (vocals, guitars, flute) in January 1979. This revamped line-up recorded Can't Hold Back (June 1979), which turned out to be their last for RCA. Sax player Jeff Kirk accompanied the band on some of their dates during the 1979 tour.

Casablanca Records, who at this time was trying to play down its reputation as primarily a disco label, signed Pure Prairie League and other non-dance acts to its roster in 1980. In January, guitarist Jeff Wilson came in to replace Bolin and the band's next release, Firin' Up (February 1980) spawned the hits "Let Me Love You Tonight" and "I'm Almost Ready", both sung by Gill, with saxophone accompaniment by David Sanborn. A second Casablanca release, Something in the Night (February 1981), kept Pure Prairie League on the charts with "Still Right Here in My Heart". However, as fate would have it, Casablanca ultimately went bankrupt and was sold to Polygram Records. Polygram then dropped most of Casablanca's roster, including Pure Prairie League.

Both Gill and Wilson left in early 1982 and Gill pursued a successful solo country career.

Later years
Despite the lack of a recording contract, the group still found itself in demand as a live act and played in clubs and at outdoor festivals.

Tim Goshorn returned in 1982 and Mike Hamilton (vocals, guitars, from Kenny Loggins' band) also joined the same year and was there for six months (until mid-1982). Al Garth (vocals, woodwinds, fiddle, keyboards), another Loggins alumnus (Loggins & Messina, also Poco and Nitty Gritty Dirt Band), joined as well, from 1982 to 1985.

Longtime drummer Billy Hinds retired from the road in 1984. He was first succeeded by Merel Bregante (also ex-Loggins & Messina and Nitty Gritty Dirt Band) and then by Joel Rosenblatt (1985–1986) and Steve Speelman (ex-Steele) (1986–1988). Sax player Dan Clawson took over for Garth in 1985 and Gary Burr (vocals, guitars) was there from 1984 to 1985.

1985 also saw the return of the group's co-founder Craig Fuller (who had fronted the groups American Flyer and Fuller/Kaz in the mid-to-late 1970s, after he had returned to music).

Mementos 1971-1987, which contained re-recordings of their best known material plus four new songs, was released on the small Rushmore label in December 1987 and was recorded back in Ohio, where the band had returned to their home base. It featured guest appearances from many of the band's alumni, including Gill, Powell, the Goshorns, Call, Burr, Rosenblatt and Mike Hamilton.

In 1988 the band decided to call it quits. Fuller, who had already joined a reformed Little Feat in 1987, played with Pure Prairie League for their final shows in the spring of 1988.

Rebirth
A decade later (in 1998), Pure Prairie League was back with a line-up of Fuller, Connor, Reilly, Burr, Fats Kaplin (pedal steel guitar, mandolin, banjo, fiddle, accordion, washboard) and Rick Schell (vocals, drums, percussion). After two years, Burr was succeeded by Curtis Wright (vocals, guitars) in June 2000. The group began work on a new album in 2002, yet abandoned the sessions and separated again after Schell became busy with other projects.

Michael Connor (born December 7, 1949) died after a long battle with cancer on September 2, 2004, at age 54. Following Connor's death, the group resumed touring once again with Fuller, Reilly, Schell, Wright and Kaplin (when available) and released All in Good Time in November 2005. Their first album in 18 years, this release appeared on the small Drifter's Church label.

Since this time, Pure Prairie League has continued to tour, playing a handful of shows every year. Donnie Lee Clark replaced Curtis Wright in late 2006 after Wright joined Reba McEntire's band. Mike Reilly was sidelined in 2006 after he was forced to undergo a liver transplant. Jack Sundrud (from Poco) came in to sub for Reilly. Rick Plant also did a brief stint with them on bass before relocating to Australia in late 2006. Jeff "Stick" Davis (from Amazing Rhythm Aces) sat in on bass for Mike in 2007. In May 2007 Reilly appeared at a few shows and played guitar yet was unable to come back full-time until 2008. John David Call played some concerts in 2006 & 2007, standing in for Kaplin, and returned to the band full-time in June 2010.

As of May 2011, it was announced, via the Pure Prairie League website, that Fuller would not be appearing at all of the band's shows that year, as he decided to take a break from touring. He ended up leaving the group again altogether by 2012. On February 10, 2012 at The Syndicate in Newport, Kentucky, Fuller, his son Patrick, Tommy McGrail, and George Ed Powell (a frequent guest at their Ohio shows in recent years) took to the stage to join the current Pure Prairie League line-up of John David Call, Mike Reilly, Rick Schell and Donnie Lee Clark. In May 2012 Scott Thompson (vocals, drums, percussion) replaced Rick Schell, who departed to continue to grow his real estate business.

Former member Tim Goshorn (born November 27, 1954) died at his home in Williamstown, Kentucky after a bout with cancer on April 15, 2017, at age 62.

In 2018 the group added additional member Randy Harper on vocals, guitar and keyboards.

Tim Goshorn's brother Larry, who had played with Pure Prairie League from 1973 to 1978, also fell victim to cancer and died on September 14, 2021.

In 2021 long time bassist Mike Reilly retired from the road due to health issues and fifteen year veteran Donnie Lee Clark departed as well, paving the way for new members Jared Camic (vocals, bass) and Jeff Zona (vocals, guitar). Reilly did return briefly in February 2022 as a special guest on the Rock Legends Cruise. 

The band endorses a number of charitable efforts, Pittsburgh's ongoing BurghSTOCK Concert Series among them.

Members

Current
 John David Call — pedal steel guitar, banjo, dobro (1970–1972, 1973–1977, 2010–present; guest 2006–2007)
 Scott Thompson — vocals, drums, percussion (2012–present)
 Randy Harper - vocals, guitar, keyboards (2018–present)
 Jared Camic - vocals, bass (2021-present)
 Jeff Zona - vocals, guitar (2021-present)

Former
 Craig Fuller - vocals, lead guitar, bass (1970–1973, 1985–1988, 1998–2002, 2004–2012; somewhat inactive while touring, 2011–2012)
 George Ed Powell — vocals, rhythm guitar, lead guitar (1970—1978; occasional guest at Ohio shows since 1998) 
 Phill Stokes — bass (1970—1971)
 Robin Suskind — guitar, mandola (1970–1972?)
 Tom McGrail — drums (1970—1971)
 Jim Caughlan — drums, guitar (1971—1972)
 Jim Lanham — bass (1971–1972)
 Billy Hinds — drums, percussion (1972–1984)
 Michael Reilly - vocals, bass (1972-1988, 1998-2021)
 Michael Connor — piano, keyboards, synthesizers (1972–1988, 1998–2004; died 2004)
 Larry Goshorn — vocals, guitars (1973–1978; died 2021)
 Tim Goshorn - pedal steel guitar (1977/1978–1978, 1982—1988; died 2017)
 Vince Gill – vocals, guitars, banjo, mandolin, fiddle, violin (1978–1982)
 Steven Patrick Bolin — vocals, guitars, flute, saxophone (1979–1980)
 Mike Hamilton — vocals, guitars (1982)
 Al Garth — vocals, saxophone, woodwinds, fiddle, keyboards (1982—1985)
 Merel Bregante — drums (1984–1985)
 Gary Burr - vocals, guitars (1984–1985, 1998–2000)
 Joel Rosenblatt — drums (1985–1986)
 Dan Clawson — saxophone (1985–1988)
 Steve Speelman — drums (1986–1988)
 Rick Schell - vocals, drums, percussion (1998–2012)
 Jeff Wilson — guitars (1980–1982)
 Fats Kaplin — pedal steel guitar, mandolin, banjo, fiddle, accordion, washboard (1998–2010)
 Curtis Wright - vocals, guitars (2000–2006)
 Donnie Lee Clark - vocals, guitars (2006-2021)

Temporary and touring
 Chris Peterson — vocals, guitar (1978)
 Jeff Redefer - guitar (1978)
 Jeff Kirk — saxophone (1979)
 Jack Sundrud – bass (2006)
 Rick Plant - bass (2006)
 Jeff “Stick” Davis – bass (2007)

Timeline

Discography

Albums

Singles

References

External links

Pure Prairie Band Booking Information - GigMasters

American country rock groups
American soft rock music groups
Musical groups established in 1970
RCA Records artists
Thirty Tigers artists
Casablanca Records artists
Musical groups from Ohio